Cenderawasih or cendrawasih may refer to:

 Paradisaea, a genus of birds of paradise known in Indonesian as "cenderawasih"
 Cendrawasih (dance), a Balinese dance inspired by the bird of paradise
 Cenderawasih Bay, a large bay in Western Papua, Indonesia
 Cenderawasih languages, a group of languages spoken around the bay
 Cenderawasih Pos, the major newspaper of Papua, Indonesia
 Cenderawasih University, Papua, Indonesia
 Cendrawasih Papua F.C., a football club of Indonesia